The 1965 NCAA University Division Cross Country Championships were the 27th annual cross country meet to determine the team and individual national champions of men's collegiate cross country running in the United States. Held on November 22, 1965, the meet was hosted by the University of Kansas at Rim Rock Farm in Lawrence, Kansas. This was the first meet not held at Michigan State. The distance for this race was extended to 6 miles (9.7 kilometers).

All NCAA University Division members were eligible to qualify for the meet. In total, 17 teams and 148 individual runners contested this championship.

The team national championship was retained by the Western Michigan Broncos, their second team title. The individual championship was won by John Lawson, from Kansas State, with a time of 29:24.00. Given this was the first race at 6 miles, Lawson's time became the meet's distance record. However, his time would be superseded the following year, 1966, by Gerry Lindgren from Washington State.

Men's title
Distance: 6 miles (9.7 kilometers)

Team Result (Top 10)

See also
NCAA Men's Division II Cross Country Championship

References
 

NCAA Cross Country Championships
NCAA University Division Cross Country Championships
NCAA University Division Cross Country Championships
NCAA University Division Cross Country Championships
Lawrence, Kansas
Track and field in Kansas
University of Kansas
Sports competitions in Kansas